Counterpart International is a non-profit organization headquartered in Arlington, Virginia. Since its founding in 1965, Counterpart has established programs and activities in more than 60 countries on six continents.

History
The organization was established in 1965 as the Foundation of the People of the South Pacific (FSP) by an Australian Marist missionary priest, Father Stanley Hosie, and actress Betty Bryant. Ms. Silverstein and Father Hosie focused on supporting communities in the remote and often-overlooked islands of the South Pacific.
In 1968, the organization began receiving funding from the United States Agency for International Development (USAID). During the 1970s, FSP obtained more grants to expand its staff and to transition its field offices into indigenous, independent NGOs that were locally staffed. FSP improved on the model of international aid by providing institutions in the South Pacific with skills to rebuild infrastructure, develop sustainable solutions to poverty, and facilitate economic growth. 
In 1992, (USAID) tapped the organization to “go global” and help determine a role for U.S. non-governmental organizations (NGOs) in the former Soviet Union. At this time, the  organization's name was changed to Counterpart International to better reflect an expanded mission.

Inclusive Social Accountability (ISA)
Counterpart International’s Inclusive Social Accountability© (ISA) developmental framework integrates elements of social inclusion and community accountability into one comprehensive program design and implementation approach.  ISA fosters more durable solutions by engaging government to make the policy or service delivery changes needed.

Programs and Goals

Counterpart International currently has programs in civil society and governance; social inclusion; communities in conflict; food security and nutrition; and climate resiliency.

Governance Security
Our current efforts in more than 30 countries around the world empower individuals, organizations and networks to take an active role in shaping the development of their communities and countries. We recognize the power of local ownership, and support efforts to enhance transparency and accountability which contribute to the strengthening of partnerships and cooperation between different sectors of society.

 Social Inclusion  Since its founding in 1965, Counterpart has focused on gender equity and social inclusion as guiding principles. We believe the voice of every community member matters, and everyone has the right to participate in their community’s well-being. In all our programs, we bring marginalized people into civic life, supporting their ability to influence decisions that affect their lives.
 Communities in Conflict  Communities around the world are under enormous stress from political unrest, gang violence, competition over resources, extremist influence and the aftermath of war and ethnic conflict. With partners and leaders at the community and national level Counterpart works to promote tolerance, mitigate conflict, accelerate reconciliation and improve community resiliency.

Health Security

 Front line access Counterpart works to improve to health services by promoting inclusive social accountability and effective monitoring of health service providers. Counterpart addresses major health emergencies by engaging influential local stakeholders in developing and disseminating appropriate health messages and engaging governance actors in monitoring government response to the crises, and works to ensure that last mile realities regarding health services provision inform “first mile” processes and decision making.

Food Security
To realize the full potential of any society, populations need to be healthy, starting with children. Counterpart works with local partners around the world to improve the production of and access to nutritious food for children. We support community-led and school-based efforts to reduce malnutrition, implement sustainable agricultural practices and improve food security.

 Climate Resiliency  The challenges facing people in many countries where we work are made worse by the impacts of climate change. Counterpart works with coastal and farming communities to improve climate resiliency while improving livelihoods.

Board of Directors

Counterpart has a staff of 800 people in more than 25 countries with headquarters in Arlington VA. The organization is overseen by a board of directors who are responsible for the legal and fiduciary operations of the organization. The current board of directors consists of:

Board Chair: Raul Herrera, Partner, Arnold & Porter LLP
Board Vice Chair: Mary Karen Wills, Managing Director, Berkeley Research Group, LLC
Dr. Carlos F. Aguilar, CEO, Texas Central Partners, LLC
Hilda M. Arellano, Counselor, USAID (retired); Coordinating Director for Economic Affairs and Development, U.S. Embassy Afghanistan (retired)
Jose Guillermo Castillo, CEO, Corporación Castillo Hermanos; President, 2020 Foundation
Dr. Thomas E. Lovejoy, Senior Fellow, United Nations Foundation
Ann C. Hudock, President and CEO, Counterpart International
Roldan Trujillo, Founder and Managing Director, RCT Advisory LLC
Diana Walker, President, Walker Impact Strategies
Judith Whittlesey, Executive Vice President, Susan Davis International
Jocelyn Brown Hall, Deputy Regional Representative, Regional Office for Africa of the Food and Agriculture Organization of the United Nations (FAO)
Lois Bruu, Vice President, Humanitarian & Development team, MasterCard
William Hammink, Career Minister, U.S. Senior Foreign Service/U.S. Agency for International Development (USAID) (retired)

Accomplishments

In 1991, President George Bush awarded FSP co-founder Betty Silverstein with the U.S. Presidential End Hunger Award for Individual Achievement. First Lady Hillary Clinton also commended Silverstein at Counterpart's 500th humanitarian Airlift at Andrews Air Force Base in Virginia in early 1998.

In May 2009, Counterpart was granted a Leader with Associates (LWA) Cooperative Agreement with USAID, who expressed confidence in Counterpart to implement the "Global Civil Society Strengthening" (GCSS) program that builds the capacity of civil society organizations around the world. Counterpart held the LWA for eight years, and received $350 million in awards through the agreement.

References

External links
 Counterpart International Website
 Counterpart LinkedIn

Non-profit organizations based in Arlington, Virginia
Charities based in Virginia
Development charities based in the United States
United States Agency for International Development